Watagans is a national park located in New South Wales, Australia,  north of Sydney.

This park has some fine rainforest scenery.

See also
  Protected areas of New South Wales

References

City of Lake Macquarie
National parks of the Hunter Region
Protected areas established in 1999
1999 establishments in Australia